Higuera de Zaragoza is a city in the municipality of Ahome in the northwestern part of the state of Sinaloa, Mexico.  It lies at latitude 25° 59' N, longitude 109° 20' W at an elevation of 9 meters above sea level.  It is located on the Gulf of California between Agiabampo and Topolobampo, near Las Grullas. The community had a 2005 census population of 8,976 inhabitants and is the third-largest town in the municipality, after Los Mochis and Ahome.

The city is the birthplace of Major League baseball pitcher Dennys Reyes.

Climate

References
Link to tables of population data from Census of 2005 INEGI: Instituto Nacional de Estadística, Geografía e Informática

External links
Municipio de Ahome Official website of Municipality of Ahome

Populated places in Sinaloa